The Alesis Andromeda A6 (A6 is an acronym: A - A, 6 - SIX, and their consonance corresponds to "ASICs" which is an abbreviation for "Application Specific integrated Circuits") is a 16-voice, 16-channel multitimbral analog synthesizer by Alesis which was released in 2000 and discontinued in 2010.  The Andromeda has analog oscillators and filters combined with modern digital control. It can be considered a hybrid of older and newer technologies, but its entire signal path is purely analog. The VCOs have a very practical pitch correction function, a feature missing on other old polysynths. The VCOs have FM and ring modulation and sub-oscillators. These features makes it possible to create a much wider sonic palette than usual on analog polysynths.

Specifications
 Polyphony: 16 voices
 Oscillators: 2 oscillators (with subs) per voice, 5 waveforms available (sine, triangle, pulse, up saw, down saw)
 Filter: 2-pole multimode resonating filter per voice, 4-pole lowpass resonating filter per voice (32 total)
 Effects: Digital reverberation, chorus, echo, analog distortion, quad pitch-shifting, flange, and more
 Arpeggiator: Up, Down, Up/Down
 Sequencer: 16-step, analog style; both have MIDI sync
 Keyboard: 61 keys (velocity and aftertouch sensitive) and a ribbon controller
 Program Memory: 256 preset and 128 user-defined
 Mix Memory: 128 user-defined
 Memory Card Slot: PCMCIA-format
 Control: MIDI (16-parts)
 Date Produced: March 2001 – 2010
 Dimensions (WxHxD): 40.1" x 4.8" x 16.1" (1019 mm x 122 mm x 409 mm)

References

Bibliography

Further reading

External links
 A6 Andromeda Community Website.

Andromeda A6
Analog synthesizers
Polyphonic synthesizers